Devikulam taluk is one of the 5 taluks in Idukki district of Indian state of Kerala. Devikulam taluk comprises 13 villages.

Constituent Villages
Devikulam taluk has 13 villages:
Anaviratty, Kannan Devan Hills, Kanthalloor, Keezhanthoor, Kottakamboor, Kunchithanny, Mankulam, Mannamkandam, Marayoor, Munnar, Pallivasal, Vattavada and Vellathuval.

Demographics
As of 2011 Census, Devikulam taluk had a population of 177,621 which constitutes 89,040 males and 88,581 females. Population in the age group 0-6 was 17,091 (9.6%). Devikulam taluk had overall literacy of 86.29%. The male literacy rate stands at 90.85% and the female literacy rate was 81.72%.

Languages
Malayalam and Tamil are the most widely spoken languages in Devikulam taluk.

Religions
Devikulam taluk  constitutes major chunk of Hindus and Christians followed by Muslims and other minorities.

References

Taluks of Kerala